KWin is a window manager for the X Window System and a Wayland compositor. It is released as a part of KDE Plasma 5, for which it is the default window manager. KWin can also be used on its own or with other desktop environments.

KWin can be configured by scripting using QML or QtScript, both of which are based on ECMAScript.

History

Look and feel 
There are many window decorations for KWin, including the current default Breeze (shown below), the previous default Oxygen, Microsoft Windows-like Redmond, and Keramik.

Compositing 
Currently available compositing backends include OpenGL 1.2, OpenGL 2.0, OpenGL 3.1 and OpenGL ES 2.0.

Included effects 

As of KDE 4.3 the following effects are built-in:

Accessibility

Appearance

Candy

Focus

Tools

Window management

See also

Comparison of X window managers

References

External links 
 KWin release notes for KDE4.0
 Decorations for KWin 4

Compositing window managers
Free X window managers
KDE Software Compilation
Linux windowing system-related software
Wayland compositors
X window managers extensible by scripting